A  (resident record or residence certificate) is a registry of current residential addresses maintained by local governments in Japan. Japanese law requires each resident to report his or her current address to the local authorities who compile the information for tax, national health insurance and census purposes. 

Once a jūminhyō has been registered with the local government, one can register for various social services including the national health insurance plan. When proof of residence is required, such as for opening a bank account or registering children at a local school district, one needs to obtain a copy of this record from the local government office. Jūminhyō registration is also required in order to officially register a name seal (inkan), which functions as one's official signature. The jūminhyō is different from a koseki (family register), which is the formal record of a family's history.

Inclusion of non-Japanese residents
In February 2009, the Ministry of Internal Affairs and Communications announced plans to amend the current jūminhyō system by 2012 to include non-Japanese residents, citing government efficiency for the change. The change became effective on July 9, 2012, abolishing the alien registration system. From this date onwards, residents of both Japanese and non-Japanese citizenship are recorded in the same system.

Honorary jūminhyō
Local authorities occasionally issue honorary jūminhyō to animals, as well as statues, snowmen, and fictional characters. On February 12, 2002, Nishi Ward office in Yokohama issued an honorary jūminhyō to Tama-chan, an arctic bearded seal who took up residence in the rivers of Yokohama and Tokyo and became a national celebrity. This prompted a group of non-Japanese residents to paint whiskers on their faces and stage a protest march to demand their own jūminhyō.

The manga character Astro Boy was issued an honorary jūminhyō by Niiza, Saitama.

Controversies
Until July 9, 2012, only Japanese citizens were allowed to be listed on a jūminhyō; residents of other nationalities were recorded in a separate alien registration system. This two-tier resident registration system was a source of controversy within the foreign community in Japan, particularly among international families where non-Japanese family members were not listed alongside Japanese family members as being part of the same household. It was possible, however, to add a footnote in the "bikōran" (remarks) section to a Japanese spouse's jūminhyō indicating that their non-Japanese spouse is the de facto head of household (事実上の世帯主, jijitsu-jo no setainushi). This however was left to local governments to decide whether to grant this request.

After leaders of the Aum Shinrikyo sect were arrested for a Sarin gas attack, members of the group successfully complained that local authorities in several areas had refused to allow them to register, effectively preventing them from receiving government services, in order to discourage them from settling there.

See also
 Basic Resident Registers Network or "Juki Net"
 New resident's card system replaces Japanese alien registration card

References

External links
 Information on obtaining a jūminhyō (Outdated—the new Foreign residents' registration system is similar to the jūminhyō)

Civil registries
Law of Japan